Varun Kumar (born 4 June 1980) is an Indian former cricketer. He played 21 first-class matches for Delhi between 2001 and 2008.

See also
 List of Delhi cricketers

References

External links
 

1980 births
Living people
Indian cricketers
Delhi cricketers
Cricketers from Delhi